Joseph Peitz  (November 8, 1869 – December 4, 1919) was an outfielder in Major League Baseball of German descent. He played for the St. Louis Browns in 1894.

His brother, Heinie Peitz, was his teammate on the Browns.

References

External links

1869 births
1919 deaths
Major League Baseball outfielders
St. Louis Browns (NL) players
Baseball players from Missouri
19th-century baseball players
Macon Hornets players
Montgomery Grays players